Teemu Sakari Wirkkala (born January 14, 1984, in Kokkola) is a Finnish javelin thrower. His personal best throw is 87.23 metres, achieved in July 2009 in Joensuu.

Achievements

Seasonal bests by year
 2000 – 68.21
 2001 – 69.22
 2002 – 74.56
 2003 – 80.57
 2004 – 80.97
 2005 – 80.68
 2006 – 82.82
 2007 – 84.06
 2008 – 84.10
 2009 – 87.23
 2010 – 86.53
 2011 – 82.39
 2012 – 83.73
 2013 – 82.91
 2014 – 77.45
 2015 – 84.39

References
 

1984 births
Living people
People from Kokkola
Finnish male javelin throwers
Athletes (track and field) at the 2008 Summer Olympics
Olympic athletes of Finland
Sportspeople from Central Ostrobothnia
20th-century Finnish people
21st-century Finnish people